Below are the mintage figures for the 50 State quarters.

The following mint marks indicate which mint the coin was made at:

P = Philadelphia Mint

D = Denver Mint

S = San Francisco Mint

1999 quarters

Delaware

Pennsylvania

New Jersey

Georgia

Connecticut

2000 quarters

Massachusetts

Maryland

South Carolina

New Hampshire

Virginia

2001 quarters

New York

North Carolina

Rhode Island

Vermont

Kentucky

2002 quarters

Tennessee

Ohio

Louisiana

Indiana

Mississippi

2003 quarters

Illinois

Alabama

Maine

Missouri

Arkansas

2004 quarters

Michigan

Florida

Texas

Iowa

Wisconsin

2005 quarters

California

Minnesota

Oregon

Kansas

West Virginia

2006 quarters

Nevada

Nebraska

Colorado

North Dakota

South Dakota

2007 quarters

Montana

Washington

Idaho

Wyoming

Utah

2008 quarters

Oklahoma

New Mexico

Arizona

Alaska

Hawaii

See also 

 United States cent mintage figures
 Lincoln cent mintage figures
 United States nickel mintage figures
 United States quarter mintage figures
Washington quarter mintage figures
America the Beautiful quarter mintage figures
 Kennedy half dollar mintage figures

References 

Twenty-five-cent coins of the United States